The Return of Monte Cristo may refer to:

 The Return of Monte Cristo (1946 film), an American film
 The Return of Monte Cristo (1968 film), a French film